Mohamed Yusuf Jama commonly called Indhosheel is a Somali politician. He was governor of Mudug and the president of Khatumo State.

On 18 March 2014, he arrived in Mogadishu to break off Khatumo's relationship with the Federal Government of Somalia.

On 2 August 2018, he accused Somaliland of being behind the suicide bombing attack in Buuhoodle the previous day.

See also
Politics of Somalia

References

Somalian politicians
Living people
Year of birth missing (living people)